Timothy Ridout (born 1995) is a British violist and 1st Prizewinner of the prestigious Lionel Tertis International Viola Competition.

Biography
Ridout studied at the Royal Academy of Music in London with Martin Outram and graduated in 2016 with the Queen's Commendation for Excellence. Ridout completed his master's at the Kronberg Academy with Nobuko Imai in 2019.

In 2016 Ridout won 1st Prize in the Lionel Tertis International Viola Competition. He was the first British violist to win the first prize since the competition was established in 1980.
He made his debut recital at the Wigmore Hall in London in March 2017 with Anthony Hewitt (piano), and also that year released his debut album 'Vieuxtemps – Complete Works for Viola' with Champs Hill Records.

Ridout became a BBC New Generation Artist in 2019, which overlapped with being selected in 2020 by the Bowers Program of the prestigious Chamber Music Society of the Lincoln Center for a three-season residency (2021 to 2024).

Ridout released his second album, a quartet of orchestrally accompanied pieces, in February 2020, with the Lausanne Chamber Orchestra. 
In August 2020, Ridout collaborated in a recording of The Carnival of the Animals for the Decca label with the Kanneh-Masons, at Abbey Road Studios. The following August, Ridout performed the work with the Kanneh-Masons at a Family Prom at the Royal Albert Hall.

His third solo album, A Poet's Love, with music by Prokofiev and Schumann arranged for viola (Ridout) and piano (Frank Dupree), released in August 2021, was a Gramophone Magazine Critics' Choice, a Presto Editor's Choice and was nominated in the Chamber Music category at the International Classical Music Awards 2022.

Ridout performed the Walton Viola Concerto at the BBC Proms in August 2021 with the BBC Symphony Orchestra, conducted by Sakari Oramo. Ridout's performance was lauded by The Strad critic, who referred to his encore (Hindemith Viola Sonata, second movement), as the encore of the season.

At the Royal Philharmonic Society (RPS) Awards, held at London’s Southbank Centre on 1 March 2023, Ridout received the Young Artists Award.

Ridout currently plays on a viola by the Brescian violin maker Pellegrino Micheli c.1565–75 on loan from the Beare's International Violin Society.

Discography

Ridout has recorded five albums:

Debut Album: Vieuxtemps, Complete Works for Viola, Timothy Ridout, viola, Ke Ma, piano. Champs Hill Records. Released 2017

Britten, Vaughan-Williams, Hindemith, Martinu – Music for Viola and Chamber Orchestra, Lausanne Chamber Orchestra, cond. Jamie Phillips. Claves Records. Released Feb. 2020

A Poet's Love – Prokofiev: Romeo & Juliet. Schumann: Dichterliebe. Timothy Ridout (viola), Frank Dupree (piano). Harmonia Mundi, Nova. Released Aug. 2021.

Berlioz, Harold en Italie, Orchestre philharmonique de Strasbourg, conducted by John Nelson. CD Erato 2022

Elgar: Viola Concerto. Bloch: Suite For Viola and Orchestra. Timothy Ridout (viola), BBC Symphony Orchestra, Martyn Brabbins. Harmonia Mundi. Release Date: 13 Jan 2023

Collaborations

Oliver Davis - Liberty, for Violin, Viola, Piano and Strings: Kerenza Peacock (violin), Timothy Ridout (viola) & Huw Watkins (piano). Liberty, Oliver Davis, Royal Philharmonic Orchestra, cond. Paul Bateman. Signum Classics. Released 2018.

Tchaikovsky & Borodin - String Quartets No. 2. Julian Steckel, Anna Reszniak, Antje Weithaas, Tanja Tetzlaff, Byol Kang, Barbara Buntrock and Timothy Ridout. Avi Label. Released Oct. 2019

Gliere, Shostakovich & Hahn - Glière: Octet Op. 5; Hahn, R: Piano Quintet in F sharp minor; Shostakovich: Two pieces for string octet, Op. 11.  Hanna Weinmeister, Tanja Tetzlaff, Florian Donderer, Byol Kang, Gergana Gergova, Timothy Ridout and Arturo Pizarro. Avi Label. Released Oct 2019.

Suk - Piano Quintet in G minor, Op. 8; Things Lived and Dreamt, Op. 30. Kiveli Dorken (piano), Christian Tetzlaff (violin), Florian Donderer (violin), Timothy Ridout (viola), Tanja Tetzlaff (cello). Ars Produktion. Released 2020

Hindemith - Kammermusik. Kronberg Acadedmy Soloists. Schleswig-Holstein Festival Orchestra, Christoph Eschenbach. Ondine. Released Sep 2020.

Saint-Saens - Carnival of the Animals. The Kanneh-Masons, with Michael Morpurgo and Olivia Colman. Isata Kanneh-Mason (piano), Braimah Kanneh-Mason (violin), Ayla Sahin (violin), Timothy Ridout (viola), Sheku Kanneh-Mason (cello), Toby Hughes (double bass), Jeneba Kanneh-Mason (piano). DECCA. Released 6 Nov 2020.

French Works for Flute - Franck, Saint‐Saëns, Widor, Duruflé; Adam Walker (flute), James Baillieu (piano), Timothy Ridout (viola). Chandos. Released 2 April 2021.

Schubert - Octet In F Major. Wigmore Soloists. Isabelle van Keulen (violin), Benjamin Gilmore (violin); Timothy Ridout (viola); Kristina Blaumane (cello),  Tom Gibbs (double bass), Michael Collins (Clarinet), Robin O’Neill (bassoon), Alberto Menéndez Escribano (French horn). BIS. Released 29 October 2021.

Mendelssohn - The String Quintets. Doric String Quartet, Timothy Ridout (viola). Chandos. Released 25 Feb 2022.

Vaughan Williams - On Wenlock Edge, Four Hymns*, The House of Life. Nicky Spence (tenor), Julius Drake (piano), *Timothy Ridout (viola). Hyperion. Release date: 1 April 2022.

Edmund Rubbra - The Jade Mountain, Songs.  Claire Barnett-Jones (mezzo-soprano), Iain Burnside (piano), Marcus Farnsworth (baritone), Lucy Crowe (soprano), Timothy Ridout (viola), Catrin Finch (harp). Chandos. Release Date: 3 March 2023

References

British classical violists
English classical violists
Alumni of the Royal Academy of Music
Lionel Tertis International Viola Competition prize-winners
BBC Radio 3 New Generation Artists
Living people

1995 births